Captain Alvaro de Loyola Furtado BS WM OM (23 May 1914 – 23 August 1981), popularly known as Dr. Alu,  was a former member of the Goa Legislative Assembly and one of the founding members of the United Goans Party. He was also a social worker, historian, journalist, medical practitioner and humanitarian. Described as a leader among men, a man of great integrity and honour.

Early life and background 
Loyola Furtado was born in Goa, in the village of Chinchinim. He was born into one of the prominent families of Goa, the Loyolas of Orlim. His great-grandfather, José Inácio de Loyola was a fierce patriot, much before the mainstream Goa freedom struggle and the founder of Partido Indiano.

His father, Dr. Miguel de Loyola Furtado, was also an eminent doctor. Loyola Furtado was also an activist who edited the "A India Portuguesa" . His elder brother, Mario de Loyola Furtado, was the icon behind Goa's oldest publication the "A India Portuguesa" and is considered a legal luminary amongst Goan lawyers from the Portuguese era.

Education
After completing his primary schooling, Loyola Furtado admitted in Rachol Seminary. He moved to Bangalore for further studies and then passed Inter-Science with distinction from St. Aloysius College. He obtained his medical degree from Madras Medical College in 1941.

Role in World War II
Loyola Furtado also served in the Indian Medical Service under the South East Asia Command during World War II. He was a Captain for four years in Nira and Chittagong, Bengal. He was awarded the Burma campaign medal, Long Service Medal and War Medal for his meritorious service.

Philanthropy
After World War II, Loyola Furtado returned to his native village and started his medical practice. He served the poor and the rich without distinction, often waking up at unearthly hours. He was actively involved in the Tuberculosis Control Programme and was awarded the title, "Chief of 'Ordem dos Médicos da Índia Portuguesa". Loyola Furtado was concerned about the decline of the Comunidades and in 1961 he wrote a paper advocating its continuance. As a member of the Goa legislature he moved various resolutions that covered Goan rural life.

Mayor of Salsette
During Portuguese rule, Loyola Furtado was the mayor of Salcete Municipality for two years where he worked pro-bono. He resigned as he felt that the Portuguese Administration hurt nationalist feelings.

Instituto Vasco da Gama
At the Instituto Vasco da Gama, he wrote articles that led the Governor General Vassalo e Silva to reinstate to the comunidades full ownership rights and abolish rents (foro). Later, he resigned from the Instituto in protest against the Governor's interference in cultural institutions. The Portuguese administration had marked him as a member of the Margao Group of Autonomists and anti-Salazarists.

Scholar
Loyola Furtado spoke fluent English, Portuguese, Konkani and Latin. He wrote various papers, mostly in Portuguese. Os Primordios de Inprensa e do Jornalismo em Goa e no Resto da índia was an essay on the history of printing and journalism in India. O Diréito de Propriedade Rústica nas Comunidades Aldeanas was a treatise on the Communidades (Ganvkaar) system in Goa and an advocacy of its continuance.

Role in Goa's Liberation Movement
Loyola Furtado was a Goan patriot. He advocated autonomy for the Portuguese colonies in India. When India's independence was declared, the movement for Goa's freedom gained momentum. In July 1946, he took part in a public meeting that openly petitioned the Salazar administration to grant autonomy to the Estado da India. The meeting was presided by his grandfather, José Inácio de Loyola. Laxmikant Bhembre proposed a committee to pursue autonomy. Loyola Furtado was one of the members of this committee. However their efforts did not move Salazar.

Political career
Loyola Furtado was a founding member of the United Goans Party headed by Dr. Jack de Sequeira. He successfully brought about the merger of four political parties that formed the UGP. He was also a member of the "Congresso Provincial de Goa" and also a member of the delegation that met Prime Minister Jawaharlal Nehru, to apprise him of the aspirations of Goans, for a separate political identity.

In the first Goa, Daman and Diu Assembly elections, Loyola Furtado contested from Navelim Assembly constituency on the United Goans Party ticket and won. He led a revolt against the party president, Dr. Jack de Sequeira in 1967 on the issue of the Goa Opinion Poll and formed a splinter group that came to be known after him as United Goans Party (Furtado Group). The remaining members came to be known as United Goans Party (Sequiera Group).

The assembly had been dissolved prior to the Opinion Poll to ensure a free and fair referendum. In the following election, the Furtado Group contested in six constituencies. They lost all seats.

Death
Loyola Furtado died on 23 August 1981. His funeral at Chinchinim was attended by thousands of villagers, patients, medical professionals and politicians.

Legacy
In recognition of his contribution, the locals of Chinchinim have admiringly named the main road from St Sebastian's Chapel, Chinchinim, to the Assolna bridge in his honour.

Remembrance
Teotonio de Souza published a work  "A Scholar's Discovery of Goa", Alvaro de Loyola Furtado: A Tribute from his Fellow Citizens  in 1982 as a tribute to Loyola Furtado.

See also
United Goans Party
Goa Opinion Poll
Dr. Jack de Sequeira
List of Indian Medical Service officers

References

External links
A description of Alvaro de Loyola Furtado's ancestral house and family history.

Medical doctors from Goa
1981 deaths
Madras Medical College alumni
Indian Roman Catholics
1914 births
Goa, Daman and Diu MLAs 1963–1967
Indian Medical Service officers
United Goans Party politicians
20th-century Indian medical doctors